Haraldsdóttir is an Icelandic patronymic surname, literally meaning "daughter of Harald". Notable people with the name include:

Birna Berg Haraldsdóttir (born 1993), Icelandic handball player
Dröfn Haraldsdóttir (born 1991), Icelandic handball player
Erla Dögg Haraldsdóttir (born 1988), Icelandic swimmer
Freyja Haraldsdóttir (born 1986, Icelandic politician and disability rights activist
Ingibjörg Haraldsdóttir (born 1942), Icelandic poet and translator

Icelandic-language surnames